Adam Alexander may refer to:

Adam Alexander (sportscaster) (born 1973) American sportscaster
Adam Rankin Alexander (1781–1848), US Congressman from Tennessee
Adam Alexander Armstrong (1909–1982), Australian politician
Adam Alexander Dawson (1913–2010), Scottish film director
Demo Taped (born 1998) singer-songwriter from Atlanta, Georgia
Adam Alexander (The Bold and the Beautiful), a character from the American soap opera
Adam Alexander (horticulturalist), British horticulturalist

See also
 Alexander Adam (1741–1809), Scottish educator and author